The Eighth Wonder is a 1995 opera by Alan John and with a libretto by Dennis Watkins about the building process of the Sydney Opera House.

Production history
The Eighth Wonder was premiered by The Australian Opera at the Sydney Opera House on 14 October 1995 in the presence of the composer and librettist. The opera was broadcast on television by the Australian Broadcasting Corporation on the Friday evening following the world premiere performance.

It was revived by the same company (by this time known as Opera Australia) again at the Sydney Opera House in 2000.

Lyndon Terracini, artistic director of Opera Australia, announced that the work would be performed as part of the 2016 season at the Sydney Opera House, retitled as Sydney Opera House: The Opera. This new adaptation was performed outdoors on the steps of the Opera House, with the audience wearing headphones to hear the singers and orchestra with clarity.

In 2020, spurred by composer Stephen Rae's desire to listen to the opera and finding it unavailable, a project commenced to promote the opera through a comprehensive website dedicated to the opera. the website was launched in March 2021 and resulted in a cover story feature in the April 2021 edition of Limelight magazine.

Plot
The opera tells the story of the very building in which it was performed. Soon after the building was commissioned and work had commenced the State Premier who administered its genesis died.

The opera suggests that the Premier believed that if the work was not sufficiently advanced and there was a change of government then the project would be cancelled. Therefore, the foundation work was commenced before the architect had solved the problem of how to build the main structure of the building. The time and cost estimates were also understated to ensure work commenced. There were many other engineering and design problems that had not been solved when work had commenced.

The opera supports the idea that the architect was fully competent to solve these problems and indeed was able to provide solutions that were far more elegant than anything that anyone less inspired, less talented and at one with a vision could provide.

Some time after that there was indeed a change of government. There was much hostility toward the building and the new government was not willing to let the architect complete the project. Much scandal was made of the time and cost of the project. The state bureaucracy wrested control from its architect and the architect's intentions for the interiors of the building were never realised. The architect left the country and disowned the building.

Characters in the opera include the politicians, the architect, an engineer, socialites, and a prominent conductor (the maestro) who betrays the cause of opera for the cause of concert music (see full cast list below). There are also two young artists who firmly identify their future with the building. The names of the characters do not match their real-life counterparts and there are, no doubt, certain other fictional elements.

There is a large chorus and the music is quite accessible, with several bright choral climaxes. The opera consists of two acts, with a total of 15 scenes including Parliament House, the construction site and the suburban backyard where the young artists spend time with their families.

The opera concludes leaving the audience with a sense of loss for the complete vision that was never realised but also with an enormous sense of gratitude and wonderment that as much of that vision that has been completed has been.

Premiere cast and creatives
Cast:
The Architect – David Hobson
Alexandra Mason – Clare Gormley
The Politician/High Priest – John Pringle
The Engineer – Roger Lemke
Stephen Goldring – Anthony Elek
The Maestro – Donald Shanks
The Premier – Robert Gard
Sky/Aunt Olive/Tour Guide – Emma Lysons
Earth/Aunt Jean/Miss Hodges – Linda Calwell
Madame Magda – Heather Begg
Ken Mason/Aide de Camp – Geoffrey Chard
Eileen Mason/The Queen – Kerry Elizabeth Brown
Juror/Government Spokesman – David Brennan
Architect's Daughter/Clare Goldring – Catherine Kelso
Socialites – Anne Way, Caroline Clack, Judith Fay-Taylor
Socialite/Second Woman – Dawn Walsh
Art Lovers – Scott Hannigan, Christopher Bath, Leslie Andrews
Music Lover – Jin Tea Kim
Reporters – Stephen Mathews, Nicholas Davidson
MP's Wife/First Woman – Susan Barber
Government MP – David Aston
Second Government MP/Opposition MP – David Lewis
Onlooker/Foreman – David Aston
Italian Worker – Mario Alafaci
Famous Writer – Christopher Bath
Speaker of the House – Geoffrey Crook
Government Whip – Robert Mitchell
Olympic Swimmer – Simon Beckett
Warrior Prince – Jason Moore
Architect's Wife – Amber Simpson

Creative team:
Conductor – Richard Gill
Director – Neil Armfield
Set designer – Brian Thomson
Costume designer – Angus Strathie
Lighting designer – Rory Dempster
Choreographer – Kim Walker
Australian Opera and Ballet Orchestra – Concertmaster: Tony Gault
The Australian Opera Chorus – Chorus preparation: Richard Gill

References

External links
 

Operas by Alan John
English-language operas
Operas
1995 operas
Operas set in Australia
Opera world premieres at Sydney Opera House
Operas set in the 20th century